Dr. Jenő Hammersberg (14 March 1845 – 20 February 1918) was a Hungarian politician and lawyer, who served as Crown Prosecutor of Hungary from 1896 to 1902. Formerly he was a Member of Parliament between 1872 and 1878. He retired in 1902.

References

External links
 Magyar Életrajzi Lexikon

1845 births
1918 deaths
Politicians from Košice
Hungarian jurists